Sabrina Kolker (born September 14, 1980) is a Canadian rower who competed in the 2004 Summer Olympics in Athens and the 2008 Summer Olympics in Beijing.

Kolker was born in Comox, British Columbia, and grew up in West Vancouver. She attended high school at Phillips Exeter Academy and then attended Stanford University.

References 

Canadian female rowers
Phillips Exeter Academy alumni
Stanford University alumni
Olympic rowers of Canada
Rowers at the 2004 Summer Olympics
Rowers at the 2008 Summer Olympics
1980 births
Living people
People from Comox, British Columbia